Kilcoy District Historical Society was formed in 1998 as the Kilcoy Shire Historical Society in recognition of the need to actively collect and record the social history of the Kilcoy district, businesses and local identities. Following the successful centenary publications of the Kilcoy State School and St. Mary's Anglican Church by volunteers in the 1990s, the Kilcoy District Historical Society have scanned several thousand images from private collections and recorded oral stories on film, retelling the personal lives of many of the district's pioneer families. 
This volunteer work has formed the basis of several published works on the early pioneers of Kilcoy.

Museum
The establishment of a small museum space in Yowie Park is home to the Kilcoy District Historical Society. The Hall of History provides a small venue for visitors and the sharing of local information.

See also

 History of Queensland
 History of Somerset Region

References

Further reading

External links 
 Kilcoy Historical Society
 History at work: Kilcoy District Historical Society [videorecording], Creator: Scheu, A. 2010. John Oxley Library, State Library of Queensland

Somerset Region
History of Queensland
Historical societies of Australia